Dichomeris pyretodes is a moth in the family Gelechiidae. It was described by Edward Meyrick in 1914. It is found in Guyana, Brazil and Peru.

The forewings are ochreous whitish, the dorsal three-fifths suffusedly tinged with pale ferruginous. The markings are suffused, dark ferruginous and there is a small mark on the base of the costa, as well as an irregular patch extending in the disc from the base to one-fourth and a slender streak along the costa from two-fifths to three-fourths. There are elongate marks towards the costa about the middle and at three-fourths, as well as a streak through the disc from about one-third to three-fourths interrupted by a whitish dot representing the first discal stigma and two representing the second. A short oblique streak terminates in the costa above the apex and there is a line along the apical portion of the costa. The hindwings are grey.

References

Moths described in 1914
pyretodes